Lyncornis is a genus of eared nightjar in the family Caprimulgidae.

Taxonomy
The genus Lyncornis was introduced in 1838 by the English ornithologist John Gould
with Lyncornis cerviniceps Gould 1838 as the type species. This taxon is now treated as a subspecies of the great eared nightjar. The genus name combines the Ancient Greek lunx, lunkos meaning "lynx" with ornis meaning "bird.

Species
The genus contains two species:

These two species were formerly placed in the genus Eurostopodus. They were moved to the resurrected genus Lyncornis based on the results of a molecular phylogenetic study published in 2010 that found large genetic differences between the great eared nightjar and the other species in Eurostopodus.

References

 
Bird genera